The Science North Production Team is a group that produces object theatres, multi-media presentations and large format film productions for science museums and educational facilities around North America. In addition, the team also develops educational media for Science North Center in Sudbury, Ontario, Canada producing content on a variety of topics.

An agency of the provincial government of Ontario, Science North is overseen by the provincial Ministry of Culture.

Origins 
Members of the Team:
Rob Gagne  Executive Producer	
John Alden Milne  Director/Editor  
Andrea Martin  Producer/Production Coordinator
Amy E Wilson  Editor			
Richard Wildeman  Animator
Tim Marshall Jr  Animator

Notable productions

Filmography 
Ground Rules (2008) Director: John Alden Milne, Cinematographer: Dylan Macleod, Executive Producers: Jim Marchbank, Guy Labine, Supervising Producer: David Lickley

Critical appraise 
The Production team were among the winners of the 14th annual international TEA Themed Entertainment Association Thea awards.

References 

Wings Over The North
Jane Goodalls Wild Chimpanzee
Caterpillar: Ground Rules
COTA
Awards
attractionsontario.ca
teaconnect.org
Climate Change	
SNO
2008 Michael Smith Award for Science Promotion by the Natural Sciences and Engineering Research Council of Canada
Ground Rules Article in CSC Magazine

Film production companies of Canada
Companies based in Greater Sudbury